Carlos Apolinar Lemos Simmonds (October 23, 1933 – July 30, 2003) was the sixth Vice President of Colombia.

Political career
After graduating Lemos worked as a Municipal Judge in the town of Piendamó, Cauca. He later transferred to Bogotá where he was elected councilman in the early 1970s for three consecutive terms. He then ran for the Chamber of Representatives of Colombia. During the government of President Julio César Turbay Lemos was appointed as Secretary General of the Presidency of Colombia. In the same administration he was promoted to minister of the Ministry of Foreign Affairs, after that he was shifted to different ministries, Ministry of Government, Ministry of Information Technologies and Communications (Colombia).

Lemos served later as Ambassador of Colombia to the Organization of American States (OAS), drafter of the Colombian Constitution of 1991, Ambassador of Colombia to Austria, Ambassador of Colombia to Great Britain, senator, vice president and president of Colombia temporarily.

As a member of the Colombian Foreign Affairs Commission he contributed towards resolving the dispute over San Andrés y Providencia Islands in the Caribbean sea between Colombia and Nicaragua for territorial waters. He also negotiated the peace process with the M-19 guerrilla.

Personal life
Carlos Apolinar was born on 23 October 1933 in Popayán, Cauca to Antonio José Lemos Guzmán and María Antonia Simmonds Pardo. He married María Victoria Perez y Soto Bohorquez, with whom he had four children: María Eugenia, Carlos José, María Victoria, and Adriana. He later divorced Perez y Soto, and in 1987 married Marta Piedad Blanco Guauke on October 13, 1987, in the state of Virginia (U.S.), which was registered at the Consulate of Colombia in Washington, D.C., and in turn at the First Notary of Colombia; later in the light of the Civil Marriage Law in Colombia (Decree 2668 of 1988) and after the Holy See granted him the annulment of the Catholic marriage with María Victoria Pérez y Soto, (since August 2, 1993) they remarried civilly, on October 19, 1994, which was registered in Notary 27 of Bogotá, under public deed No. 11910..

Lemos died on 30 July 2003 in Bogotá, D.C. after a fight with lung cancer. In accordance with his last will and testament, he was mourned and buried privately, and did not receive a state funeral as he would have been entitled.

References
 Colombia.com Carlos Lemos Simmonds biography
 Presidency of Colombia; Carlos Lemos Simmonds biography

1933 births
2003 deaths
People from Popayán
University of Cauca alumni
20th-century Colombian lawyers
Colombian Liberal Party politicians
Members of the Chamber of Representatives of Colombia
Foreign ministers of Colombia
Colombian Ministers of Government
Ministers of Communications of Colombia
Permanent Representatives of Colombia to the Organization of American States
Members of the Constituent Assembly of Colombia
Ambassadors of Colombia to Austria
Ambassadors of Colombia to the United Kingdom
Vice presidents of Colombia
Colombian journalists
Male journalists
Deaths from lung cancer
Deaths from cancer in Colombia
20th-century journalists